This page shows the results of the Men's Wrestling Competition at the 1983 Pan American Games, held from August 14 to August 29, 1983, in Caracas, Venezuela.

Men's competition

Freestyle (– 48 kg)

Freestyle (– 52 kg)

Freestyle (– 57 kg)

Freestyle (– 62 kg)

Freestyle (– 68 kg)

Freestyle (– 74 kg)

Freestyle (– 82 kg)

Freestyle (– 90 kg)

Medal table

References
 Sports 123

P
1983
Events at the 1983 Pan American Games
Wrestling in Venezuela